Pennville is an unincorporated community in Chattooga County, in the U.S. state of Georgia.

History
The community was named for the local Penn family, the original owner of the town site.

References

Unincorporated communities in Chattooga County, Georgia
Unincorporated communities in Georgia (U.S. state)